The Mount is the former official residence of the senior officer of the Royal Navy stationed in Gibraltar.

History
The Mount is said to have been built in 1797 but one of it first residents was Captain Harry Harmwood who was a Naval Commissioner in Gibraltar from 1793 to 1794. The Mount was purchased in 1799 and for over two hundred years it was the home of the most senior naval officer in Gibraltar.  It was part of the military presence here even before the massive extension of the naval facilities at the end of the nineteenth century when £1.5m was spent on work that included three dry docks and the Detached Mole. That work had originally been suggested in 1871 by Captain Augustus Phillimore who was the senior naval officer in Gibraltar and would have lived here.

In 1903 it was home to early use of colour photography. In 1903 Sarah Angelina Acland visited her brother Admiral Sir William Acland in Gibraltar. She was said to be earliest traveller to use colour photography. Acland took photographs of Europa Point looking out from Europe to Africa, pictures of flora in the Admiral's residence, The Mount and a photo of the local ornithologist Colonel William Willoughby Cole Verner. He would have had to keep still for two minutes whilst three different pictures were taken to capture the red, blue and green components of the image. In 1904 she exhibited in Britain 33 three-colour prints under the title The Home of the Osprey, Gibraltar.

Currently The Mount is owned by the Government of Gibraltar. It is used as a wedding venue.

References 

Buildings and structures in Gibraltar